Sinnington  is a village and civil parish in the Ryedale 
district of the county of North Yorkshire, England. It is located on the southern boundary of the North York Moors National Park.

According to the 2001 UK census, the parish has a total population of 318 people living in 148 households, reduced to a population of 287, at the 2011 Census.

The nineteenth century agricultural writer, William Marshall, was born here in 1745.
The village was formerly served by a railway station on the  Gilling and Pickering (G&P) railway line which opened in 1875 and closed on 31 January 1953 for both passengers and freight.

Typical of the area are the medieval cruck-built longhouses of Sinnington. These were constructed as single storey combined dwelling and beast houses and made of the local Jurassic limestone.  Originally they had ling thatched roofs, but they were mostly re-roofed in the 19th century with grey slate or red pantiles. All Saints' Church has in its fabric an assemblage of dozens of fragments of pre-Norman crosses and hogback fragments scattered all over the building, inside and out. It appears that several - perhaps the numbers even reach double figures - significant crosses were broken up in order to provide building stone for the twelfth-century workers who built the church.

Catherine Parr was resident in the manor of Sinnington, as Lady Latimer, between 1534 and 1543. She was the second wife of John Neville, 3rd Baron Latimer. The manor in nearby Nunnington was owned by her brother William Parr.

Governance
An electoral ward in the same name exists. This ward stretches south to Brawby with a total population taken at the 2011 census of 1,685.

References

External links

Villages in North Yorkshire
Civil parishes in North Yorkshire